Lilljansberget is a mountain, and since 2005 a residential area, in Umeå, Sweden. It is located next to the Umeå University. All the apartments are owned by AB Bostaden.

References

Umeå